Favorites and Rarities is a 1993 compilation album by American musician Don McLean.

Track listing

Disc one
"Castles in the Air" (Mediarts version) - 2:55
"And I Love You So" - 4:18
"American Pie" - 8:35
"Vincent (Starry, Starry Night)" - 4:01
"Babylon" - 1:44
"Empty Chairs" - 3:26
"Dreidel" - 3:47
"If We Try" (United Artists version) - 3:34
"Fool's Paradise" (Single version) - 3:51
"Sitting on Top of the World" - 1:58
"La La Love You" - 3:46
"Wonderful Baby" - 2:06
"Crying in the Chapel" - 2:21
"Magdalene Lane" (Live) 4:06
"Crying" - 3:43
"Since I Don't Have You" - 2:36
"Castles in the Air" (Millennium version) - 3:43
"He's Got You" - 4:51
"Superman's Ghost" - 4:47
"You Can't Blame the Train" - 3:06

Disc two
"Good Old Wagon" - 2:25
"Milkman's Matinee" - 5:22
"Aftermath" - 4:05
"Mother Nature" - 6:57
"Every Day" (BBC version) - 2:33
"That's All Right" - 3:22
"Profiteering Blues" - 3:02
"Hit Parade of Love" - 2:35
"The Carnival Has Ended" - 5:39
"I'm Blue, I'm Lonesome" - 2:14
"Nature Boy" - 1:08
"Black Sheep Boy" - 2:44
"Mountains o' Mourne" (Live) - 5:14
"And Her Mother Came Too" (Live) - 2:45
"Yonkers Girl" (Live) - 3:05
"Turkey in the Straw" - 0:39
"Dubuque" - 0:50
"Sally Ann/Muleskinner Blues/Old Joe Clark" - 3:26
"If We Try" (EMI America version) - 4:00
"Perfect Love" - 3:21
"Little Child" - 3:05
"Gotta Make You Mine" - 3:15

Notes
"You Can't Blame the Train" composed by singer/songwriter Terri Sharp.

1993 compilation albums
Don McLean compilation albums